Heads Up International is a jazz record label that was formed in Cleveland, Ohio. It was bought by the Concord Music Group in 2005.

History
The label got its name from a jazz group that Dave Love formed while attending North Texas State University. After college, Love became musical director for Donald Byrd. Later, he recorded an album with his band and soprano saxophonist Dave Liebman.

While trying to sell the album to record labels, he took a position as National Director of Sales & Marketing for Oxymoron P&D, where executives convinced him to start his own label with his album. Using Oxymoron for distribution, Love began Heads Up International in Seattle, Washington, in 1990. The label's first album was The Energy of the Chance by Dave Liebman. In 2000, Heads Up International merged with Telarc International Corporation.

In 2005 the two companies were acquired by the Concord Music Group. The label's roster includes Mindi Abair, Richard Elliot, Fourplay, Mike Stern, and Peter White. Its catalog includes Stanley Clarke, George Duke, Hiroshima, Earl Klugh, Jeff Lorber, Spyro Gyra, and Take 6.

Special releases
The Heads Up Africa series was begun to mark the tenth anniversary of the end of apartheid. Musicians such as Ladysmith Black Mambazo, Miriam Makeba, Hugh Masekela, and Oliver Mtukudzi have recorded for the label.

In 2007, Heads Up released the final albums by Michael Brecker (Pilgrimage) and Joe Zawinul (Brown Street). Heads Up began its 18th year with recordings by George Duke, Taj Mahal, Esperanza Spalding, Take 6, and Victor Wooten.

For more than 12 years, the label has produced enhanced CDs with video, biographies, and other bonus material. Heads Up was among the first labels to release music in the Super Audio CD (SACD) format and the first to incorporate enhanced CD technology with SACDs.

Awards and honors
Heads Up International's musicians have appeared on the Billboard Contemporary Jazz, Traditional Jazz, and World Music charts. The label's awards include the Billboard Contemporary Latin Jazz Album of the Year (Dreams & Desires by Roberto Perera), the AFIM's Independent Contemporary Jazz Album of the Year (Love's Silhouette by Pieces of a Dream) a Grammy Award nomination in 2004 (Time Squared by the Yellowjackets), a Grammy Award for Best Traditional World Music Album in 2005 (Raise Your Spirit Higher by Ladysmith Black Mambazo), a Grammy nomination for Best Surround Sound Award in the first surround sound category at the Grammys (Raise Your Spirit Higher by Ladysmith Black Mambazo), ten additional Grammy nominations for  Spyro Gyra, Mike Stern, the JazzWeek Radio Programmers Album of the Year Award for two consecutive years (Word of Mouth Revisited and The Word Is Out! by Jaco Pastorius), and Gibson Guitar's Best Female Jazz Guitarist (Joyce Cooling). Heads Up artists have regularly captured the No. 1 position in national radio airplay.

Roster 

Mindi Abair
Gerald Albright
Acoustic Alchemy
Ann Armstrong
The Bad Plus
Philip Bailey
Walter Beasley
Kenny Blake
Bona Fide
Michael Brecker
Caribbean Jazz Project
Citrus Sun
Stanley Clarke
Richie Cole
Joyce Cooling
Paquito D'Rivera
Stefán Dickerson
George Duke
Candy Dulfer
Fourplay
Tony Gable & 206
Carlos Guedes
Hiroshima
Incognito
Henry Johnson
Ladysmith Black Mambazo
Chuck Loeb
Jeff Lorber
Bobby Lyle
Miriam Makeba
Hugh Masekela
Joe McBride
Marion Meadows
Oliver Mtukudzi
Najee
Andy Narell
Maceo Parker
Jaco Pastorius Big Band
Roberto Perera
Pieces of a Dream
Doc Powell
Sakésho
Diane Schuur
Eric Scortia
Richard Smith
Esperanza Spalding
Spyro Gyra
Mike Stern
Nestor Torres
Two Siberians
Gerald Veasley
Pamela Williams
Victor Wooten
Yellowjackets
Zap Mama
Joe Zawinul
Alexander Zonjic

References

External links 
Official site

American record labels
Jazz record labels
 
 
Concord Music Group